This is a list of Roman Latin poets and writers from North Africa.

Poets
Corippus
Claudian 
Terence
Luxorius 
Dracontius

Writers
Augustine of Hippo 
Cassius Dionysius 
Saint Cyprian
Septimius Severus
Ptolemy
Apuleius

References

North Africa
 
Roman from North Africa
 
North African culture
Latin poets and writers from North Africa